Friends at Court is a 1956 comedy novel by the British writer Henry Cecil. It was published in the United States the following year by Harper Publications. It is a sequel to his bestseller Brothers in Law. Roger Thursby the hero of the original novel is now flourishing in the legal profession and has hopes of soon being made a Queen's Counsel. It was followed in 1962 by a third book in the series Sober as a Judge.

References

Bibliography
 Reilly, John M. Twentieth Century Crime & Mystery Writers. Springer, 2015.
 White, Terry. Justice Denoted: The Legal Thriller in American, British, and Continental Courtroom Literature. Greenwood Publishing Group, 2003

1956 British novels
Novels by Henry Cecil
Novels set in London
British comedy novels
Michael Joseph books
Sequel novels